"Ching-a-Ling" is a song by American rapper Missy Elliott. It was written by Elliott along with frequent collaborator Cainon Lamb as well as Shawn Campbell and Marshall Leathers from production duo The Arkitects for what was supposed to be Elliott's seventh studio album Block Party, while production was helmed by Lamb, Campbell, and Leathers. In the song, sound elements of the 1981 arcade game Donkey Kong are heard throughout the song. 

Serving as the lead single for the soundtrack of the dance drama film Step Up 2 the Streets (2008), the song premiered on both Elliott's MySpace and official website on January 10, 2008 before released digitally by The Goldmind Inc. and Atlantic Records on January 22, 2008. Within a week, it had debuted on the US Billboard Hot R&B/Hip-Hop Songs chart. Released to positive reviews, "Ching-a-Ling" was ranked 69th on Rolling Stones list of the 100 Best Songs of 2008.

Critical reception
Blues & Soul found that "the tune packs a powerful punch and is instantly catchy. It just sounds like one that will burn very brightly for a short while and then be forgotten. It's a club-friendly bubbler that would sit nicely alongside the likes of Eve's "Tambourine," with several winning elements in place – a nonsensical infectious hook, bass-heavy buzzing beat, and a feisty vocal edge." In a retrospetive review of the song, Steven J. Horowitz fom Vulture remarked: "There was something repetitive about "Ching-a-Ling" that closely followed the blueprints Elliott had set before it: the reversed vocal lines, the whistles, the incessantly chanted chorus. It felt almost too familiar, and yet, still welcome as one of the liveliest of her post-Cookbook cuts." Rolling Stone ranked the song 69th on its 100 Best Songs of 2008 listing.

Music video
Elliott reteamed with director Dave Meyers to film a music video for "Ching-a-Ling", which features portions from her other Step Up 2 the Streets single "Shake Your Pom Pom" (2008). Filmed in 3D, the video guest-stars the famous Japanese hip hop dance group ,U-Min, known for their slow motion dancing and popping. Shot in Los Angeles, California in January 2008, stylist Misa Hylton worked on the set. The video premiered on MTV's TRL and BET's 106 & Park on February 4, 2008.

The "Ching-a-Ling" portion of the music video is set primarily with a white backdrop featuring Elliott and various background dancers, such as U-Min. Other shots are interspersed throughout the video which relate to the lyrics, such as Elliott swinging on a rope swing in an Autumn setting, and playing a DDR-esque game which uses the letters of Ching-A-Ling instead of arrows. The "Shake Your Pom Pom" portion of the music video is set in what appears to be a house party, with Elliott and others dancing before ending with Elliott and others blowing noisemakers at the camera.

Remixes
The official remix of "Ching-a-Ling" features rappers Busta Rhymes and singer Ciara.
Other additional remixes featuring Kid Capri, Precious Latoye and Buckshot were released via mixtapes and radio airplay.

Charts

Weekly charts

Year-end charts

Release history

References

2008 singles
2008 songs
Missy Elliott songs
Music videos directed by Dave Meyers (director)
Songs written for films
Songs written by Missy Elliott